The Stockmayer potential is a mathematical model for representing the interactions between pairs of atoms or molecules. It is defined as a Lennard-Jones potential with a point electric dipole moment.

A Stockmayer liquid consists of a collection of spheres with point dipoles embedded at the centre of each. These spheres
interact both by Lennard-Jones and dipolar interactions. In the absence of the point dipoles, the spheres face no rotational
friction and the translational dynamics of such LJ spheres have been studied in detail. This system, therefore, provides
a simple model where the only source of rotational friction is dipolar interactions

References

M. E. Van Leeuwe "Deviation from corresponding-states behaviour for polar fluids", Molecular Physics 82 pp. 383-392 (1994)
 Reinhard Hentschke, Jörg Bartke, and Florian Pesth "Equilibrium polymerization and gas-liquid critical behavior in the Stockmayer fluid", Physical Review E 75 011506 (2007)

Quantum mechanical potentials
Theoretical chemistry
Molecular physics